Qermezi Bagh (also Romanized as Qermezī Bāgh) is a village in Charuymaq-e Jonubesharqi Rural District, Shadian District, Charuymaq County, East Azerbaijan Province, Iran. At the 2006 census, its population was 209, in 36 families.

References 

Populated places in Charuymaq County